The blue-and-gold tanager (Bangsia arcaei) is a species of bird in the family Thraupidae.
It is found in Costa Rica and Panama.
Its natural habitats are subtropical or tropical moist lowland forests and subtropical or tropical moist montane forests.
It is threatened by habitat loss.

References

blue-and-gold tanager
Birds of Costa Rica
Birds of Panama
blue-and-gold tanager
blue-and-gold tanager
blue-and-gold tanager
Taxonomy articles created by Polbot